The Quantum Universe: Everything That Can Happen Does Happen is a 2011 book by the theoretical physicists Brian Cox and Jeff Forshaw.

Overview
The book aims to provide an explanation of quantum mechanics and its impact on the modern world that is accessible to a general reader. The authors say that "our goal in writing this book is to demystify quantum theory". Starting with the concepts of wave–particle duality and a non-technical description of the path integral formulation of quantum mechanics, the book explains the uncertainty principle, energy levels in atoms, the physics of semi-conductors and transistors, and the Standard Model of particle physics. A more mathematical Epilogue discusses the role of quantum mechanics in models of stellar evolution, and derives the Chandrasekhar limit for the maximum mass of a stable white dwarf.

See also
 Quantum field
 Quantum mechanics

References
The Quantum Universe: Everything That Can Happen Does Happen, 2011, Brian Cox and Jeff Forshaw, 
Review by Doug Johnstone, 23 October 2011, The Independent
Review by Chrqis Cook, 28 October 2011, The Financial Times
Review by David Kaiser, 16 November 2011, The Guardian
Review by Manpit Kumar, 24 October 2011, The Daily Telegraph
Review by Elmar Bergeler, 8 January 2013, Science Niblets

2011 non-fiction books
Popular physics books
Cosmology books
Allen Lane (imprint) books